Polite People is a 2011 Icelandic comedy film directed by Olaf de Fleur Johannesson.

Cast
 Stefán Karl Stefánsson as Lárus Skjaldarson
 Ágústa Eva Erlendsdóttir as Margrét
 Hilmir Snær Guðnason as Hrafnkell
 Eggert Þorleifsson as Markell
 Ragnhildur Steinunn Jónsdóttir as Hanna
 Halldóra Geirharðsdóttir as Elín
 Benedikt Erlingsson as Þorgeir
 Gunnar Hansson as Jónatan
 Ingvar Eggert Sigurðsson as Þorsteinn
 Friðrik Friðriksson as Danskur ljósmyndari
 Jóhann G. Jóhannsson as Askur

References

External links
 
 

2011 films
2011 comedy films
2010s Icelandic-language films
Films directed by Olaf de Fleur
Icelandic comedy films